The Chief Directorate of Railroad Construction Camps (GULZhDS)
was a directorate of NKVD (later MVD) in charge of Gulag labor camps which manned railroad construction during 1940-1953. It was created on January 4, 1940 under the title Chief Directorate of Railroad Construction (GULZhD). Since 1941 is has become known as  GULZhDS. Its main task was railroad construction, with other occasional projects, such as construction of highways in Ukraine and Volga Region, some plants, airfields, mines and housing. Its best known project was the construction of the Baikal–Amur Mainline.

Ditrectors
January 1940: Naftali Frenkel
April 1947: major general 
August 1948: major general of engineering 
 August 1951: subcolonel  of engineering (later colonel of engineering)

References

Gulag
NKVD
1940 establishments in the Soviet Union
1953 disestablishments in the Soviet Union
Chief Directorate of Railroad Construction Camps